7 Seeds was written and illustrated by Yumi Tamura and published by Shogakukan. It began serialization in the November 2001 issue of the monthly shōjo (aimed at teenage girls) manga magazine Bessatsu Shōjo Comic; in April 2002, it transferred to the monthly josei (aimed at young adult women) manga magazine Flowers. The final chapter was published in the July 2017 issue of Flowers, released on May 27. Shogakukan collected the individual chapters into 35 bound volumes, printed under the Flower Comics imprint, and later, under the Flower Comics Alpha imprint. Each volume was divided into sections focusing on different groups of survivors, with section titles containing a kigo (seasonal word) appropriate for the group name.

In 2008, Pika Édition licensed the manga in France, where it was marketed as a seinen (aimed at young adult men) manga series. In 2011, Pika announced that negotiations with the Japanese publisher, Shogakukan, had been unsuccessful, and therefore, they would cease publishing 7 Seeds and two other titles. In total, Pika published 10 volumes of the manga in French.

In 2017, after the conclusion of the 7 Seeds manga in Japan, Tamura announced the launch of a spin-off series in Flowers. The first chapter was published in the magazine's October issue, released on August 28; the final chapter was published in the December issue, released on October 28. Shogakukan collected the chapters into a single bound volume on January 10, 2018.

References

External links
 Official drama CD website 
 Interview with Yumi Tamura about 7 Seeds 
 

7 Seeds